De Heptarchia Mystica, or On the Mystical Rule of the Seven Planets, is a book written in 1582-83 by English alchemist John Dee. It is a guidebook for summoning angels under the guidance of the angel Uriel and contains diagrams and formulae.

See also
 De Occulta Philosophia 
 Picatrix

References

 

1583 books
Alchemical documents
Enochian magic
English non-fiction books
John Dee